Joseph Putnam Willson (January 7, 1902 – August 3, 1998) was a United States district judge of the United States District Court for the Western District of Pennsylvania.

Education and career
Born in Bath, New York, Willson received a Bachelor of Science degree from the University of Pennsylvania in 1926 and a Bachelor of Laws from the Temple University Beasley School of Law in 1931. At received a football scholarship at Penn and played as a tackle for the Penn Quakers. He was elected captain of the 1925 Penn Quakers football team.

Willson was in private practice in Smethport, Pennsylvania from 1931 to 1953. He served in the United States Naval Reserve during World War II, from 1942 to 1945. He was a member of the Pennsylvania Game Commission from 1948 to 1953, and was a Special Master for the Supreme Court of the United States from 1964 to 1972.

Federal judicial service
On June 8, 1953, Willson was nominated by President Dwight D. Eisenhower to a seat on the United States District Court for the Western District of Pennsylvania vacated by Judge Owen McIntosh Burns. Willson was confirmed by the United States Senate on July 14, 1953, and received his commission the same day. He assumed senior status on October 18, 1968, serving in that capacity until his death on August 3, 1998, in Smethport.

References

External links
 

1902 births
1998 deaths
20th-century American judges
20th-century American lawyers
American football tackles
Judges of the United States District Court for the Western District of Pennsylvania
Penn Quakers football players
Temple University Beasley School of Law alumni
United States district court judges appointed by Dwight D. Eisenhower
United States Navy personnel of World War II
United States Navy reservists
People from Bath, New York